The 2013 India Super Series will be the fourth super series tournament of the 2013 BWF Super Series. The tournament was held in New Delhi, India from 23 to 28 April 2013 and had a total purse of $200,000. A qualification will be held to fill four places in both singles events and Men's doubles of the main draws.

Men's singles

Seeds

Top half

Bottom half

Finals

Women's singles

Seeds

Top half

Bottom half

Finals

Men's doubles

Seeds

Top half

Bottom half

Finals

Women's doubles

Seeds

Top half

Bottom half

Finals

Mixed doubles

Seeds

Top half

Bottom half

Finals

References

India
India Open (badminton)
Super Series
Sport in New Delhi